Eocene Thermal Maximum 2 (ETM-2), also called H-1 or the Elmo (Eocene Layer of Mysterious Origin) event, was a transient period of global warming that occurred around either 54.09 Ma or 53.69 Ma. It appears to be the second major hyperthermal that punctuated the long-term warming trend from the Late Paleocene through the early Eocene (58 to 50 Ma).

The hyperthermals were geologically brief time intervals (<200,000 years) of global warming and massive input of isotopically light carbon into the atmosphere. The most extreme and best-studied event, the Paleocene-Eocene Thermal Maximum (PETM or ETM-1), occurred about 1.8 million years before ETM-2, at approximately 55.5 Ma. Other hyperthermals likely followed ETM-2 at nominally 53.6 Ma (H-2), 53.3 (I-1), 53.2 (I-2) and 52.8 Ma (informally called K, X or ETM-3). The number, nomenclature, absolute ages and relative global impact of the Eocene hyperthermals are the source of much current research.
In any case, the hyperthermals appear to have ushered in the Early Eocene Climatic Optimum, the warmest sustained interval of the Cenozoic Era. They also definitely precede the Azolla event at about 49 Ma.

ETM-2 is clearly recognized in sediment sequences by analyzing the stable carbon isotope composition of carbon-bearing material. The 13C/12C ratio of calcium carbonate or organic matter drops significantly across the event. This is similar to what happens when one examines sediment across the PETM, although the magnitude of the negative carbon isotope excursion is not as large. The timing of Earth system perturbations during ETM-2 and the PETM also appear different. Specifically, the onset of ETM-2 may have been longer (perhaps 30,000 years) while the recovery seems to have been shorter (perhaps <50,000 years). (Note, however, that the timing of short-term carbon cycle perturbations during both events remains difficult to constrain).

A thin clay-rich horizon marks ETM-2 in marine sediment from widely separated locations. In sections recovered from the deep-sea (for example those recovered by Ocean Drilling Program Leg 208 on Walvis Ridge), this layer is caused by dissolution of calcium carbonate. However, in sections deposited along continental margins (for example those now exposed along the Waiau Toa / Clarence River, New Zealand), the clay-rich horizon represents dilution by excess accumulation of terrestrial material entering into the ocean. Similar changes in sediment accumulation are found across the PETM. In sediment from Lomonosov Ridge in the Arctic Ocean, intervals across both ETM-2 and the PETM shows signs of higher temperature, lower salinity and lower dissolved oxygen.

The PETM and ETM-2 are thought to have a similar generic origin, although this idea is at the edge of current research. During both events, a tremendous amount of 13C-depleted carbon rapidly entered the ocean and atmosphere. This decreased the 13C/12C ratio of carbon-bearing sedimentary components, and dissolved carbonate in the deep ocean. Somehow the carbon input was coupled to an increase in Earth surface temperature and a greater seasonality in precipitation, which explains the excess terrestrial sediment discharge along continental margins. Possible explanations for changes during ETM-2 are the same as those for the PETM, and are discussed under the latter entry.

The H-2 event appears to be a "minor" hyperthermal that follows ETM-2 (H-1) by about 100,000 years. This has led to speculation that the two events are somehow coupled and paced by changes in orbital eccentricity.

As in the case of the PETM, reversible dwarfing of mammals has been noted during the ETM-2.

See also
 Paleocene–Eocene Thermal Maximum

References

External links
 
 

History of climate variability and change
Eocene